Chester Edwin Bryan (October 29, 1859 – January 11, 1944) was a Democratic politician and newspaper publisher in the U.S. state of Ohio who was Ohio State Treasurer from 1917 to 1919.

Biography

Chester E. Bryan was born at London, Madison County, Ohio, October 29, 1859, and continued to reside there. His father established the Madison County Democrat in 1857, and he succeeded as editor and publisher. He attended state and national Democratic Party conventions, and served as head of his county organization. He also served as president of three different state editorial associations in Ohio.

In 1916, Bryan was elected to a two-year term as Ohio Treasurer, serving January 1917 to January 1919.

Bryan died January 11, 1944, and is buried at Kirkwood Cemetery in London.

References

1859 births
People from London, Ohio
State treasurers of Ohio
Ohio Democrats
19th-century American newspaper publishers (people)
1944 deaths
Journalists from Ohio